Stephen Morrel (born 27 May 1981) is a Fijian footballer who played as a midfielder, who played in the 2004 OFC Nations Cup.

References

Living people
1981 births
Association football midfielders
Fiji international footballers
Fijian footballers
Leighton Town F.C. players
Aylesbury United F.C. players
Central United F.C. players
Expatriate footballers in England
Fijian expatriate sportspeople in England
2004 OFC Nations Cup players